Lawrence Township, Ohio, may refer to:

Lawrence Township, Lawrence County, Ohio
Lawrence Township, Stark County, Ohio
Lawrence Township, Tuscarawas County, Ohio
Lawrence Township, Washington County, Ohio

Ohio township disambiguation pages